Saint Adalbert Basilica, (referred to in Polish as Bazylika Swietego Wojciecha) is a historic Roman Catholic church located on Buffalo, New York's East Side within the Diocese of Buffalo. It is a prime example of the Polish Cathedral style of church architecture in both its opulence and grand scale. A rare and special designation bestowed on the parish occurred in 1907, when the Vatican proclaimed St. Adalbert a basilica, the first in the USA. The proclamation, as well as its English translation, can be viewed to this day in the basilica's museum room.

History
Built by Huber and Company in 1890-1891, it was built by Polish immigrants. At that time it was the largest church in Western New York and cost $63,000 without the furnishings. The 36 stained glass windows of the Basilica were produced by Franz Mayer & Co. of Munich, Germany. The interior was decorated by Jozef Mazur.

Community
The St. Adalbert's Response to Love Center, run by Sister Mary Johnice, is located next to the Basilica and provides services for the poor of Buffalo, such as hot meals, a food pantry, toys and clothing for children, GED classes, and basic career-related computer training. In 2016, St. Adalbert's former rectory was transformed into the Mother Teresa Home, a haven for pregnant women operated by the Diocesen Office of Pro-Life Activities.

Current Status
The last mass was scheduled for November 25, 2007, but had been put on hold due to the parish having filed an appeal to the Vatican. In February 2008 the Vatican's highest Canonical Court upheld Bishop Edward Kmiec's decision to close the church. An appeal was made by the "Save St. Adalbert" committee, and the process was delayed. Again revisited, The Vatican Congregation for the Clergy has upheld the decision to merge St. Adalbert Parish into St. John Kanty Parish, with St. Adalbert's remaining open for worship. The final weekly Mass at St. Adalbert's was celebrated on Sept. 18, 2011, marking the end of the yearlong observance of the 125th anniversary of the parish. St. Adalbert Basilica remains open to this day for four yearly special masses plus weddings, funerals, baptisms, tours, and other occasions.

Gallery

See also
Buffalo, New York
East Side, Buffalo, New York
Jozef Mazur
Polish Cathedral style

References

External links

 St. Adalbert's Website
 Broadway Fillmore Alive (Neighborhood Website)
 St. Adalbert's Facebook Page
 City of Buffalo Preservation Board Survey CBCA PN 03-010 (see page 5-76)
 Skyscraperpage building page

Polish-American culture in Buffalo, New York
Religious organizations established in 1891
Roman Catholic churches completed in 1891
19th-century Roman Catholic church buildings in the United States
Culture of Buffalo, New York
Tourist attractions in Buffalo, New York
Polish Cathedral style architecture
Roman Catholic churches in Buffalo, New York
1891 establishments in New York (state)
Buildings and structures in Buffalo, New York
Basilica churches in New York (state)